The Propaganda Movement encompassed the activities of a group of Filipinos who called for political reforms in their land in the late 19th century, and produced books, leaflets, and newspaper articles to educate others about their goals and issues they were trying to solve. They were active approximately from 1880 to 1898, and especially between 1880 and 1895, before the Philippine Revolution began.

Prominent members included José Rizal, author of novels Noli Me Tángere and El filibusterismo, and essays; Graciano López Jaena, publisher of La Solidaridad, the movement's principal organ; Mariano Ponce, the organization's secretary, and Marcelo H. del Pilar.

Specifically, the Propagandists aims were the following:
 Reinstate the former representation of the Philippines in the Cortes Generales or Spanish Parliament
 Secularize the clergy (i.e. use secular or diocesan priest rather than clergy from a religious order)
 Legalize Spanish and Filipino equality 
 Reestablish Spanish citizenship for Filipinos
 Reestablish the Philippines as a province of Spain
 Abolish polo y servicios (labor service) and the bandala (forced sale of local products to the government)
 Guarantee basic civil freedoms
 Provide equal opportunity for Filipinos and Spanish to enter government service

Dr. Domingo Abella, Director of the National Archives, has suggested that the Propaganda Movement
was misnamed. He believes that it should have been called the Counterpropaganda Movement because its essential task was to counteract the campaign of misinformation that certain Spanish groups were disseminating in Spain and later in Rome (the Vatican). It was a campaign of information, as well as a bid to build sympathy for political reform.

It is notable in contrast to the Katipunan, or the "K.K.K.", a Filipino revolutionary movement seeking the total independence of the Philippines from Spain. The Propaganda Movement instead sought to have the Philippines assimilated as a formal province of Spain, rather than being ruled as a colony. 

The Filipinos of this movement were using "propaganda" in its Latin sense, not the pejorative connotation it has acquired in English. For instance, the Catholic institution called Sacra Congregatio de Propaganda Fide - Sacred Congregation for the Propagation of the Faith, is now translated as 'For the Evangelization of Peoples'). It was in the latter sense that the word was used by the Filipino group that sent Marcelo H. del Pilar to Spain to continue the "propaganda" on behalf of the Philippines.

References

Philippine Revolution